Alistair Clark, Lord Clark is a Scottish lawyer who was appointed in 2016 as a Senator of the College of Justice, a judge of the Court of Session.

Career 

Clark was a university lecturer, teaching mostly commercial law and company law.  He was admitted as an advocate in 1994, and appointed as a Queen's Counsel in 2008.

In May 2016, Clark was appointed as a Senator of the College of Justice.
He was installed as a judge on 24 May 2016, taking the judicial title Lord Clark.

See also
Scots law
Courts of Scotland

References 
 

Year of birth missing (living people)
Living people
Members of the Faculty of Advocates
Scottish King's Counsel
21st-century King's Counsel
Senators of the College of Justice
Scottish legal scholars